The 2007–08 Coupe de la Ligue began on 14 August 2007. The final was held on 29 March 2008 at the Stade de France. The defending champions were Bordeaux, who defeated Lyon 1–0 on 31 March 2007. The defending champions were eliminated from the competition on 26 September 2007 by Metz. The 2008 Coupe de la Ligue champions were Paris Saint-Germain, who defeated Lens 2–1 to claim their third Coupe de la Ligue trophy and also received a place in the UEFA Cup.

First round

Second round

Third round

Round of 16

Final draw

Final draw results

Quarter-finals

Semi-finals

Final

Topscorer
Pauleta (6 goals)

External links
Coupe de La Ligue Ligue de Football Professionnel 

 
Coupe de la Ligue seasons
League Cup
France